Clearwater Analytics is a software-as-a-service (SaaS) fintech company that provides automated investment accounting, performance, compliance, and risk reporting for insurance companies, asset managers, corporations, banks, governments, and other institutions. Clearwater is a publicly traded company headquartered in Boise, Idaho, with additional offices in London, England; Edinburgh, Scotland; New York City, United States and Noida, India. Clearwater reports on over $6 trillion in investment assets.

History 

Clearwater was founded in 2004 by David Boren, Michael Boren, and Douglas Bates. Prior to founding Clearwater, David, Michael, and Douglas founded Clearwater Advisors, an institutional fixed-income investment advisor, where they developed the concept for Clearwater.

In 2019, Clearwater Analytics was named Technology Firm of the Year at the Insurance Asset Management Awards and Best Software Solution at the UK & European Captive Review Awards.

Products and services 

The Clearwater solution is a web-based investment accounting and reporting solution providing automated portfolio book-of-record accounting, daily investment policy compliance monitoring, performance tracking, risk analytics, and a variety of buy-side tools for insurers, investment managers, corporations, and other institutional investors.

Clientele 

Clearwater Analytics reports on over $5.9 trillion in investment assets. Clients include insurance companies, investment managers, corporate treasuries, governments, and other institutions across the globe. Notable clients include Mutual of Omaha, Arch Capital Group, Wilton Re., J.P. Morgan Asset Management, Facebook, Cisco, and Oracle.

Executive team 

The executive team at Clearwater Analytics is composed of Sandeep Sahai, CEO and board member; Cindy Blendu, Chief Transformation Officer; Jim Cox, CFO; Scott Erickson, President, Americas and New Markets; and Souvik Das, Chief Technology Officer.

The Clearwater Building 

In December 2013, Clearwater Analytics announced its partnership with the Gardner Co. to help finance a new nine-story building in downtown Boise to double the company's current space to over 90,000 square feet. Construction of the Clearwater building was completed in September 2016.

The Clearwater building is part of the larger City Center Plaza, which features an underground public transportation hub, an expanded convention center, Boise State University's computer science department, and the Clearwater Analytics headquarters.

Awards 
 2012 – Innovative Company of the Year, Idaho Innovation Awards
2013 – Technology Firm of the Year, Captive Review
 2014 – Idaho Private 75
2019 – Best Software Solution, UK & European Captive Review Awards
2019 – Technology Firm of the Year, Insurance Asset Management Awards

References 

Financial services companies of the United States
Financial software companies
Companies based in Idaho
Companies established in 2004
OMERS
Companies listed on the New York Stock Exchange
Companies based in Boise, Idaho
2021 initial public offerings